Statistics of Emperor's Cup in the 1980 season.

Overview
It was contested by 30 teams, and Mitsubishi Motors won the championship.

Results

1st round
Kyushu Sangyo University 2–3 Teijin
Fujitsu 2–2 (PK 8–9) Osaka University of Economics
Hyōgo Teachers 0–1 Nippon Steel
Toyo Industries 2–0 Fukuoka University
Mazda Auto Hiroshima 2–3 Yamaha Motors
Honda 2–3 Tanabe Pharmaceuticals
Osaka University of Health and Sport Sciences 0–2 Yanmar Diesel
Hitachi 4–1 Matsushima Club
Komazawa University 2–1 Nissan Motors
Hosei University 2–1 Fujieda City Hall
Tsukuba University 0–1 Furukawa Electric
Mitsubishi Motors 3–0 Furukawa Electric Chiba
Nippon Steel Muroran 0–3 Toshiba
Nissei Resin Industry 0–2 Sumitomo Metals

2nd round
Yomiuri 6–1 Teijin
Osaka University of Economics 0–1 Nippon Steel
Toyo Industries 3–2 Yamaha Motors
Tanabe Pharmaceuticals 1–0 Yanmar Diesel
Hitachi 3–1 Komazawa University
Hosei University 0–3 Furukawa Electric
Mitsubishi Motors 3–1 Toshiba
Sumitomo Metals 0–8 Fujita Industries

Quarterfinals
Yomiuri 3–2 Nippon Steel
Toyo Industries 0–0 (PK 3–4) Tanabe Pharmaceuticals
Hitachi 0–0 (PK 3–1) Furukawa Electric
Mitsubishi Motors 2–1 Fujita Industries

Semifinals
Yomiuri 1–1 (PK 3–5) Tanabe Pharmaceuticals
Hitachi 1–2 Mitsubishi Motors

Final

Tanabe Pharmaceuticals 0–1 Mitsubishi Motors
Mitsubishi Motors won the championship.

References
 NHK

Emperor's Cup
Emperor's Cup
1981 in Japanese football